John Winston Spencer-Churchill, 7th Duke of Marlborough  (2 June 18224 July 1883), styled Earl of Sunderland from 1822 to 1840 and Marquess of Blandford from 1840 to 1857, was a British Conservative cabinet minister, politician, peer, and nobleman. He was the paternal grandfather of Prime Minister Sir Winston Churchill.

Background and education
John Spencer-Churchill was born at Garboldisham Hall, Norfolk, the eldest son of George Spencer-Churchill, 6th Duke of Marlborough, and Lady Jane Stewart, daughter of Admiral George Stewart, 8th Earl of Galloway. He was educated at Eton College and Oriel College, Oxford.

He was commissioned as a Lieutenant in the Queen's Own Oxfordshire Yeomanry in 1842 and was promoted to Captain on 22 April 1847. His father and younger brother also served in the regiment.

Political career
Spencer-Churchill was Member of Parliament for Woodstock from 1844 to 1845 and again from 1847 to 1857. He was responsible for the "Blandford Act" of 1856, enabling populous parishes to be divided for purposes of Church work. In 1857, he succeeded his father in the dukedom and entered the House of Lords.

He served under Lord Derby as Lord Steward of the Household from 1866 to 1867, and under Derby and later Benjamin Disraeli as Lord President of the Council—with a seat in the cabinet—from 1867 to 1868.He was sworn of the Privy Council in 1866, and made a Knight of the Garter in 1868. On the formation of Disraeli's second cabinet in 1874, he was offered, but declined, the Viceroyalty of Ireland. He again held office under Disraeli as Lord Lieutenant of Ireland from 1876 to 1880.

Spencer-Churchill was president of the Shipwrecked Fishermen and Mariners' Royal Benevolent Society for many years. He died suddenly of angina pectoris at 29 Berkeley Square, London, on 4 July 1883. After lying in state at Blenheim Palace, he was buried in the private chapel on 10 July.

Family
On 12 July 1843, Spencer-Churchill married Lady Frances Anne Emily Vane (15 April 182216 April 1899), eldest daughter of the 3rd Marquess of Londonderry and Lady Frances Anne Emily Vane-Tempest. They had eleven children:
George Charles Spencer-Churchill, 8th Duke of Marlborough (13 May 18449 November 1892), whose son Charles Spencer-Churchill, 9th Duke of Marlborough, married into the Vanderbilt family.
Lord Frederick John Winston Spencer-Churchill (2 February 18465 August 1850)
Lady Cornelia Henrietta Maria Spencer-Churchill (17 September 1847Upper Brook Street, Mayfair, London, 22 January 1927), married 25 May 1868 Ivor Bertie Guest, 1st Baron Wimborne, by whom she had issue.
Lord Randolph Henry Spencer-Churchill (13 February 184924 January 1895), married 15 April 1874 Jennie Jerome. Their issue included Sir Winston Churchill and John Strange Spencer-Churchill.
Lady Rosamund Jane Frances Spencer-Churchill (9 November 18513 December 1920), married 12 July 1877 William Fellowes, 2nd Baron de Ramsey, by whom she had issue.
Lady Fanny Octavia Louise Spencer-Churchill (29 January 18535 August 1904), married 9 June 1873 Edward Marjoribanks, 2nd Baron Tweedmouth, by whom she had issue.
Lady Anne Emily Spencer-Churchill (Lower Brook Street, Mayfair, London, 14 November 1854South Audley Street, Mayfair, London, 20 June 1923), married 11 June 1874 James Innes-Ker, 7th Duke of Roxburghe, by whom she had issue.
Lord Charles Ashley Spencer-Churchill (25 November 185611 March 1858)
Lord Augustus Robert Spencer-Churchill (4 July 185812 May 1859)
Lady Georgiana Elizabeth Spencer-Churchill (10 St James's Square, St James's, London, 14 May 18609 February 1906), married 4 June 1883 Richard George Penn Curzon, 4th Earl Howe, by whom she had issue.
Lady Sarah Isabella Augusta Spencer-Churchill (4 July 186522 October 1929), a war correspondent during the Boer War; married 21 November 1891 Lt. Col. Gordon Chesney Wilson (son of Sir Samuel Wilson MP), by whom she had issue.

Marlborough died on 4 July 1883, aged 61, and was succeeded in the title by his eldest son, George. His wife died sixteen years later, on 16 April 1899, aged 77.

Portrayals in film and television
Marlborough was portrayed by Cyril Luckham in the 1974 Thames Television mini-series Jennie: Lady Randolph Churchill.

Ancestry

References

Attribution

External links

The Papers of the 7th Duke of Marlborough held at Churchill Archives Centre

1822 births
1883 deaths
People from Garboldisham
Alumni of Oriel College, Oxford
John Spencer-Churchill, 7th Duke of Marlborough
Conservative Party (UK) MPs for English constituencies
107
Freemasons of the United Grand Lodge of England
Knights of the Garter
Members of the Privy Council of the United Kingdom
Lord-Lieutenants of Oxfordshire
Lord Presidents of the Council
Lords Lieutenant of Ireland
Blandford, John Spencer-Churchill, Marquess of
Blandford, John Spencer-Churchill, Marquess of
Blandford, John Spencer-Churchill, Marquess of
Blandford, John Spencer-Churchill, Marquess of
UK MPs who inherited peerages
Queen's Own Oxfordshire Hussars officers
People educated at Eton College
Deaths from angina pectoris